Adam Chadaj (born 1 May 1984) is a professional tennis player from Poland.

Biography
Chadaj was born in Warsaw and turned professional in 2001.

His first Challenger title came with Stéphane Robert in the doubles event at the 2004 Poznań Open.

He represented the Poland Davis Cup team in a 2005 tie against Estonia in Gdynia and featured in two singles rubbers, for wins over Mait Künnap and Mikk Irdoja. Soon after he made his debut in an ATP Tour level tournament when he was a wild card entrant into the main draw of the 2005 Idea Prokom Open in Sopot. He won his first round match against Alessio di Mauro, then lost in the second round to José Acasuso. On the Challenger circuit in 2005 his wins included Julien Benneteau, Nicolas Mahut and Sam Querrey.

In 2006 he won a second Challenger title, the doubles event in Telde, Spain, with Sweden's Michael Ryderstedt.

He made another ATP Tour tournament appearance in 2007 at the Orange Prokom Open. Competing in the doubles, Chadaj and partner Marcin Gawron were beaten in the opening round.

Challenger titles

Doubles: (2)

See also
List of Poland Davis Cup team representatives

References

External links
 
 
 

1984 births
Living people
Polish male tennis players
Tennis players from Warsaw